ETZ may refer to:

In places
 Metz-Nancy-Lorraine Airport

In science
 Earth Transit Zone

In time zones
 Eastern  Time Zone (in the Americas), UTC-5 or UTC-4
 Australian Eastern Time Zone, UTC+10 or UTC+11
 Brazilian Eastern Time Zone, UTC-2

In politics
 Jerusalem Faction